Streptomyces xiamenensis is a bacterium species from the genus of Streptomyces which has been isolated from mangrove sediments in Xiamen in the Fujian Province in China. Streptomyces xiamenensis produces the antifibrotic drug  xiamenmycin.

See also 
 List of Streptomyces species

References

Further reading

External links
Type strain of Streptomyces xiamenensis at BacDive – the Bacterial Diversity Metadatabase

xiamenensis
Bacteria described in 2009